Central Plaza Surat Thani is a shopping mall in Surat Thani Province, Thailand.

Overview
On a 62rai (10hectare) plot, the new CentralPlaza Surat Thani will be the largest ever retail project developed by Central Pattana in the Southern Thailand. The shopping mall was inaugurated on 11 October 2012.

It expected to create between 3,000 and 4,000 jobs and generate Bt4 billion to Bt5 billion in yearly income for its tenants. 
It is the first CentralPlaza of Central Group in Southern Thailand. CPN is investing Bt1.9 billion in the new 120,000 square meter lifestyle center in Surat Thani.

CentralPlaza Surat Thani complex would cater to a million local residents who live within a 90kilometre radius, and another 1.5 million visiting the province every year. It is also expected to serve 2.8 million consumers from surrounding provinces such as Nakhon Si Thammarat, Ranong, Krabi, Chumphon and Phang Nga.

The company also plans to develop a hotel on the land next to CentralPlaza Surat Thani in the future to support visitors of the convention centre in the shopping mall.

Explained that in the initial phase the shopping centre would occupy about 40 rai, and in the second phase it would expand into a hybrid complex of indoor and outdoor shops

Anchor 
 Robinson Department Store
 Tops
 SF Cinema 7 Cinemas
 B2S
 Supersports
 Power Buy
 Officemate
 Food Park
 Suratthani Hall
Charles & Keith

See also 
 List of shopping malls in Thailand
 List of largest shopping malls in Thailand

External links 
 CentralPlaza website
 Robinson Department Store

Notes

References 
 

Shopping malls in Thailand
Central Pattana
Shopping malls established in 2012
2012 establishments in Thailand